Qazaq Radiosy is the largest broadcasting network in Kazakhstan. It began broadcasting on September 29, 1921, and is included in the Qazaqstan Radio and Television Corporation. On October 1, 2012, production moved into a new broadcasting media centre, QazMedia Ortalygy, in Astana.

History
On 29 September 1921 it was decided to establish a republic wide broadcasting station.

In October 1921, from Orenburg, Kazakhstan's capital at that time, the station began airing throughout the country.

In March 23, 1927 The station broadcast in the Kazakh language for the first time on air.

References

External links
qazradio.fm/kz/

Radio stations in Kazakhstan
Government-owned companies of Kazakhstan